Ship watching is a form of outdoor activity and tourism that is carried out worldwide by observing the passage of various ships in the waterways where there is a lot of ship traffic.

In the United States, for example, ship watching is practised in Two Harbors, Minnesota, over Lake Superior, while in Japan, it is done on the ships that pass through the Uraga Channel at Kannonzaki Park, Kanagawa, Japan. In China, as many ships go up and down the Changjiang, River Bank Parks in Hankou and in Wuchang, in the city of Wuhan, are good places to enjoy ship watching.

See also 
Whale watching
Outdoor recreation
Water transport

References

External links 
Ship Watching in the Bay of Tokyo, aboard the "Kaishu" (The Library web of the Japan Foundation, in Japanese: A total of 7 pages of ships and the national flags)
The Great Lakes Ship Watching Association

Outdoor recreation
Water transport
Types of tourism